Unia Tarnów can refer to:

Unia Tarnów (basketball)
Unia Tarnów (football)
Unia Tarnów (handball)
Unia Tarnów (speedway)
Unia Tarnów (sports club)